1904 was the fourth year for the Detroit Tigers in the American League. The team finished in seventh place with a record of 62–90 (.408), 32 games behind the Boston Americans. They played ten tie games, which is the major league record. The 1904 Tigers were outscored by their opponents 627 to 505. The team's attendance at Bennett Park was 177,796, seventh out of the eight teams in the AL. In the year before Ty Cobb's arrival, pitcher George Mullin had a higher batting average than any of the team's regulars at .290.

Regular season

Season standings

Record vs. opponents

Roster

Player stats

Batting

Starters by position 
Note: Pos = Position; G = Games played; AB = At bats; H = Hits; Avg. = Batting average; HR = Home runs; RBI = Runs batted in

Other batters 
Note: G = Games played; AB = At bats; H = Hits; Avg. = Batting average; HR = Home runs; RBI = Runs batted in

Note: pitchers' batting statistics not included

Pitching

Starting pitchers 
Note: G = Games pitched; IP = Innings pitched; W = Wins; L = Losses; ERA = Earned run average; SO = Strikeouts

Other pitchers 
Note: G = Games pitched; IP = Innings pitched; W = Wins; L = Losses; ERA = Earned run average; SO = Strikeouts

Awards and honors

League top five finishers 
Jimmy Barrett
 AL leader in bases on balls (79)
 AL leader in times on base (249)
 AL leader in games (162)
 AL leader in plate appearances (714)
 #2 in AL in singles (152)
 #4 in AL in at bats (624)
 #5 in AL in outs (465)

Bill Donovan
 #3 in AL in bases on balls allowed (94)
 #5 in AL in wild pitches (11)

Ed Killian
 #4 in AL in bases on balls allowed (93)
 #4 in AL in games finished (6)
 #5 in AL in hit batsmen (17)

Frank Kitson
 #5 in AL in home runs allowed (7)

Bobby Lowe
 3rd oldest player in the AL (38)

Matty McIntyre
 #3 in AL in sacrifice hits (28)

George Mullin
 AL leader in bases on balls allowed (131)
 #2 in AL in complete games (42)
 #2 in AL in hits allowed (345)
 #2 in AL in batters faced (1597)
 #3 in AL in shutouts (7)
 #3 in AL in losses (23)
 #4 in AL in games (45)
 #4 in AL in innings pitched (382.1)
 #4 in AL in games started (44)
 #5 in AL in earned runs allowed (102)

Bob Wood
 4th oldest player in the AL (38)

References 

 1904 Detroit Tigers Regular Season Statistics at Baseball Reference

Detroit Tigers seasons
Detroit Tigers season
Detroit Tigers
1904 in Detroit